The 2022 Campbell Fighting Camels baseball team represents Campbell University during the 2022 NCAA Division I baseball season. The Camels played their home games at Jim Perry Stadium as a member of the Big South Conference. They were led by head coach Justin Haire, in his eighth season at Campbell. 

Campbell won both the regular season and the Big South Tournament.

Background 

The 2021 Campbell Fighting Camels baseball team finished the season with a 37–18 record and a 28–9 record in Big South play. The Camels won the Big South regular season championship, but were eliminated by Presbyterian College in the Big South Tournament. Despite this, Campbell earned an at-large berth into the 2021 NCAA Division I baseball tournament as a three seed in the Starkville Regional with one-seed, Mississippi State; two-seed, VCU; and four seed, Samford. Campbell reached the Regional final on a 2–2 record before being eliminated by eventual national champions, Mississippi State.

During the 2021 MLB draft, one player from Campbell was drafted. Spencer Packard was drafted in the ninth round with the 264th overall pick by the Seattle Mariners. Packard was assigned to the club's High-A affiliate, the Everett AquaSox.

Game log

Big South tournament

NCAA Regional 

To be determined.

References

External links 
 Campbell Baseball

2022 Big South Conference baseball season
Big South Conference baseball champion seasons
2022
2022 in sports in North Carolina
2022 NCAA Division I baseball tournament participants